Purple Passages is a 1972 North American, Japan and Venezuela only double-LP compilation album by Deep Purple featuring material originally released in 1968 and 1969 on the Tetragrammaton label. It features classics such as "Hush" and "Kentucky Woman". It was issued in Japan on compact disc in 1993.

This compilation included some alternate mixes of "The Bird Has Flown" and "Why Didn't Rosemary?", with the former having a clean intro instead of a fade-in on the album version. It also included the final Purple Mk. I single "Emmaretta" for the first time on LP. Original lead singer Rod Evans went on to front the popular 1970s band Captain Beyond.

Track listing

Side one
"And the Address" (Blackmore/Lord) – 4.53
"Hey Joe" (trad., arr. Lord/Evans/Simper/Paice/Blackmore) – 6.57
"Hush" (Joe South) – 4.20
"Emmaretta" (Lord/Blackmore/Evans) – 2.58

Side two
"Chasing Shadows" (Lord/Paice) – 5.31
"The Bird Has Flown" (Evans/Blackmore/Lord) – 5.30
"Why Didn't Rosemary?" (Blackmore/Lord/Evans/Simper/Paice) – 5.00

Side three
"Hard Road (Wring That Neck)" (Blackmore/Lord/Simper/Paice) – 5.11
"The Shield" (Blackmore/Evans/Lord) – 6.02
"Mandrake Root" (Blackmore/Evans/Lord) – 6.03

Side four
"Kentucky Woman" (Neil Diamond) – 4.44
"April" (Blackmore/Lord) – 12.03

Credits

Deep Purple
 Rod Evans – vocals
 Ritchie Blackmore – lead guitar
 Jon Lord – organ, keyboards, vocals
 Nick Simper – bass guitar, vocals
 Ian Paice – drums

Charts

Certifications

References

1972 compilation albums
Warner Records compilation albums
Deep Purple compilation albums